An endangered language is a language that is at risk of falling out of use, generally because it has few surviving speakers. If it loses all of its native speakers, it becomes an extinct language. A language may be endangered in one area but show signs of revitalisation in another, as with the Irish language.

Levels of language endangerment
The United Nations Educational, Scientific and Cultural Organization defines four levels of language endangerment between "safe" (not endangered) and "extinct":
 Vulnerable - "most children speak the language, but it may be restricted to certain domains (e.g., home)"
 Definitely endangered - "children no longer learn the language as mother tongue in the home"
 Severely endangered - "language is spoken by grandparents and older generations; while the parent generation may understand it, they do not speak it to children or among themselves"
 Critically endangered - "the youngest speakers are grandparents and older, and they speak the language partially and infrequently"
 Extinct - "there are no speakers left; included in the Atlas if presumably extinct since the 1950s"

The list below includes the findings from the third edition of Atlas of the World's Languages in Danger (2010; formerly the Red Book of Endangered Languages), as well as the online edition of that publication, both published by UNESCO.

List of languages

Albania • Armenia • Azerbaijan • Belarus • Belgium • Bosnia and Herzegovina • Bulgaria • Croatia • Cyprus • Czech Republic • Denmark • Estonia • Finland • France • Georgia • Germany • Greece • Hungary • Ireland • Italy • Kazakhstan • Latvia • Liechtenstein • Lithuania • Luxembourg • Moldova • Monaco • Montenegro • Netherlands • North Macedonia • Norway • Poland • Portugal • Romania • Russia • San Marino • Serbia • Slovakia • Slovenia • Spain • Sweden • Switzerland • Turkey • Ukraine • United Kingdom

See also 

Lists of endangered languages
List of European languages
List of extinct languages of Europe
List of endangered languages in Russia
List of endangered languages in Asia

References 

 
Endangered languages
Europe